Streptovaricins are a group of structurally related macrolide antibiotics. They belong to the larger class of antibiotics known as ansamycins.

References

Macrolide antibiotics
Ansamycins